Šimkus (may also be rendered as Shimkus (phonetic) or Simkus (loss of diacritics)) is a Lithuanian-language surname derived from the name Simon (Šimon).

The surname may refer to:

 Jonas Šimkus, Lithuanian defense minister (1922)
 Modestas Šimkus, Lithuanian weightlifter
 Ona Jankauskienė-Šimkutė, a Lithuanian Righteous Among the Nations
 Šimkus Antanas,  Šimkienė Vlada, a family of Lithuanian Righteous Among the Nations
 Stasys Šimkus, Lithuanian composer
 Vestards Šimkus, Latvian pianist and composer

Lithuanian-language surnames